Kayhan Space Corp. doing business as Kayhan Space is an American space technology company based in Boulder, Colorado. Founded in 2019, their products have been centered on space-related activities. Focusing on space awareness, Kayhan Space has made products such as Pathfinder for dodging space debris and other satellites.

History 

Kayhan Space was founded in 2019  by Siamak Hesar and Araz Feyzi, immigrants from Iran. Hesar spent time in the space industry through a master's and a doctorate in aeronautics and astronautical engineering and 3 years of interning at Jet Propulsion Laboratory, while Feyzi is a co-founder of Syfer, an internet device security company.

On December 14, 2021, Kayhan Space announced that $3.7 million was raised in seed funding.

On September 28, 2022, Kayhan Space along with Astroscale and the University of Texas at Austin, won a Small Business Technology Transfer Phase 1 award. The award, worth $250,000, is under the Orbital Prime program, which is run by the technology division of the United States Space Force. The award is contracted to aerospace small business companies that work with academic or nonprofit organizations.

Products

Pathfinder 
Pathfinder is a subscription-based software designed to help space companies perform their missions without worrying and countering orbital debris and other damaging objects from affecting missions. Major customers of Pathfinder include Capella Space, Lynk Global and Globalstar.

Eagle 
Eagle is a software for orbit simulation and model for Low Earth Orbit, Geostationary orbit, and Interplanetary orbits.

Gamut 
Gamut is a software to prevent debris collisions in launch trajectories, and submitting trajectories to the government for approval.

Proxima 
Announced in 2022, Proxima is being built in cooperation with Astroscale and University of Texas at Austin, it is an enhancement of Astroscale's current system for rendezvous and proximity operations. It allows for minimal manual support for safe close-distance maneuvers.

References 

Companies based in Boulder, Colorado